Kennard High School is a public high school located in Kennard, Texas, United States, and classified as a 1A school by the UIL. It is part of the Kennard Independent School District located in eastern Houston County. In 2015, the school was rated "Met Standard" by the Texas Education Agency.

Athletics
The Kennard Tigers compete in these sports - 

Track and Field, Cross Country, Volleyball, Basketball, Tennis, Softball & Baseball

Baseball
Basketball
Cross Country
Softball
Tennis
Track and Field
Volleyball

State Titles
Boys Basketball - 
1967(B), 1968(B), 1971(1A), 1973(1A)
Girls Basketball - 
2006(1A/D1)

State Finalists  
Boys Basketball - 
2001(1A/D1)
Girls Basketball -  
2001(1A/D1), 2005(1A/D1), 2008(1A/D2)
Volleyball -  
1988(1A), 1996(1A)

References

External links
Kennard ISD

Schools in Houston County, Texas
Public high schools in Texas
Public middle schools in Texas